The  is a toll road in Kobe and Akashi, Japan. It is owned and operated by West Nippon Expressway Company and is signed as E93 under the Ministry of Land, Infrastructure, Transport and Tourism's (MLIT) "2016 Proposal for Realization of Expressway Numbering."

Route description
The Daini-Shinmei Road has two lanes in each direction. The speed limit is 70 km/h along the entirety of the road.

History
Myōdani interchange to Ōkuradani interchange opened in 1964
Suma (Tsukimiyama) interchange to Myōdani interchange opened in 1969
Ōkuradani interchange to Akashi-nishi interchange opened in 1970
The opening was timed to coincide with the Expo '70 in Osaka.

Future
MLIT is in the process of acquiring right of way to build a  extension of the Kitasen Road to link up with the Daini-Shinmei Road at an interchange in the Ishigatani area of Akashi.

Junction list
The entire expressway is in Hyōgo Prefecture. PA= parking area, SA= service area, TB= toll gate.  

|colspan="8" style="text-align: center;"|Through to

References

See also

West Nippon Expressway Company
National Route 2

Expressways in Japan
Regional High-Standard Highways in Japan
Transport in Kobe